Sherlock Holmes and the Hapsburg Tiara is a novel and Sherlock Holmes pastiche by Alan Vanneman, published in 2003 by Carroll & Graf Publishers. The book has received reviews from the Historical Novel Society, Publishers Weekly, and Kirkus Reviews.

References

External links 
 Sherlock Holmes and the Hapsburg Tiara at Goodreads

2003 novels
Sherlock Holmes pastiches
Carroll & Graf books